Ytu is a genus of beetles in the family Torridincolidae, containing these species:

 Ytu angra Reichardt & Vanin, 1977
 Ytu artemis Reichardt, 1973
 Ytu athena Reichardt, 1973
 Ytu brutus Spangler, 1980
 Ytu cleideae Vanin, 1991
 Ytu cupidus Reichardt, 1973
 Ytu cuyaba Reichardt & Vanin, 1977
 Ytu demeter Reichardt, 1973
 Ytu godayi Reichardt & Vanin, 1977
 Ytu hephaestus Reichardt, 1973
 Ytu itati Reichardt & Vanin, 1977
 Ytu mirandus Reichardt & Vanin, 1977
 Ytu mirim Reichardt & Vanin, 1977
 Ytu morpheus Reichardt, 1973
 Ytu phebo Reichardt, 1973
 Ytu reichardti Vanin, 1978
 Ytu yaguar Reichardt & Vanin, 1977
 Ytu ysypo Reichardt & Vanin, 1977
 Ytu zeus Reichardt, 1973

References

Myxophaga genera